Salvia adiantifolia is a perennial plant that is native to China, found growing in forests and in foothills.

Notes

adiantifolia
Flora of China